Uspantek, Uspantec, Uspanteco or Uspanteko may refer to:
 Uspantek people, an ethnic subgroup of the Maya
 Uspantek language, spoken by the Uspantek people